The following is the results of the Iran Super League 2009/10 basketball season, Persian Gulf Cup.

Regular season

Standings

Results

 Trust Pasargad withdrew from the league with three games remaining. All results were declared null and void.

Playoffs

Classification 5th–8th

Championship

Final standings

References
 Asia Basket
 Iranian Basketball Federation

Iranian Basketball Super League seasons
League
Iran